The list of ship launches in 1804 includes a chronological list of some ships launched in 1804.


References

1804
Ship launches